Alcione may refer to:

 Alcione, a 1638 literary work by Pierre du Ryer
 Alcione, a 1787 musical drama by João de Sousa Carvalho
 CANT Z.1007 Alcione, World War II Italian bomber aircraft
 Alcione (opera), a 1706 opera by Marin Marais
 Alcione Nazareth (born 1947), Brazilian samba singer who performs as "Alcione"
 Alcione elainus, a pterosaur species belonging to the family Nyctosauridae

See also 
 Alcyone (disambiguation)
 Halcion or triazolam, an insomnia drug
 Halcyon (disambiguation)
 Halcyon Days (disambiguation)